Chantilly Jaggernauth is an American data analytics and data visualization specialist.

Education 
Jaggernauth graduated from Howard University with a Bachelor's Degree in Management Information Systems.

Career 
Jaggernauth is the founder and CEO of Millennials and Data. She sits on the Advisory Board for the Data Literacy Project. She currently serves as the Vice President of Training and Data Visualization at Lovelytics in Washington, D.C. Jaggernauth is a Tableau Zen Master, and gives presentations and workshops using the data visualization software Tableau. Formerly, she worked in talent acquisition at Johnson & Johnson, and was a senior data analyst at Comcast.

References

External links 
Millennials and Data

American women chief executives
American company founders
Howard University alumni
Living people
Year of birth missing (living people)
21st-century American women